William Brodie (1741–1788) was a Scottish cabinet-maker, deacon and councillor, who maintained a secret life as a burglar.

William Brodie may also refer to:

 William Brodie (cricketer) (1878–1922), Guyanese cricketer
 William Brodie (sculptor) (1815–1881), Scottish sculptor
 William Bird Brodie (1780–1863), British Member of Parliament for Salisbury
 William A. Brodie (1841–1917), Grand Master of Masons in New York in 1884 who laid the foundation stone of the Statue of Liberty
 William J. Brodie (1840–?), legislator in South Carolina

See also
 William Brodie Gurney (1777–1855), English philanthropist
 William R. Brody (born 1944), President of the Salk Institute and former President of The Johns Hopkins University